Anthony Walton White Evans (October 31, 1817 – November 28, 1886), known as Walton Evans, was an American civil engineer whose work included countless railroad and canal commissions in North and South America during the mid-nineteenth century.

Birth
He was born on October 31, 1817, in New Brunswick, New Jersey, to Thomas M. Evans and Eliza Mary White. His siblings included: Elizabeth Margaret Evans and Isabelle Johanna Evans. His maternal grandfather was Brigadier General Anthony Walton White, an American Revolutionary War veteran.

Education
He attended local schools before entering the Rensselaer Polytechnic Institute in 1834. He left the school in October 1836, and then served as an assistant engineer on the Erie Canal. In 1845 he became an assistant to Allan Campbell in the construction of the New York and Harlem Railroad extension to Albany, New York. The following year he became the resident engineer on the job but resigned in 1850 to join Campbell in building the Copiapo Railroad in Chile. Evans completed the road in 1853 after Campbell's departure. Evans then served as Chief Engineer for the construction of the Arica and Tacna Railroad in Peru from 1853 to 1856.

He returned to New York and worked as a consultant for the Lima and Oroya Railway in Peru.  In that capacity, he designed the Verrugas Viaduct.  This bridge was engineered by Leffert L. Buck.  Also working on the railway was Virgil Bogue.  Both of these men were fellow RPI graduates.

Marriage
Evans returned to the United States and married Anna Zimmerman on June 24, 1856. The couple moved to Chile where Evans supervised the building of the Southern Railroad, which ran for fifty miles south of Santiago. The railroad was completed in 1860.

After his return to New York in 1860 he became a consulting engineer, and designed the Varrugas Viaduct on the Luna & Oroya Railroad. He acted as agent for a number of foreign railways to purchase equipment and recruit staff, including two locomotives for the Victorian Railways in Australia in 1876 and the NZR K class of 1877, the first American locomotives supplied to the New Zealand Government Railways. He always recommended the use of American locomotives and cars over those built in Europe. From 1862 to 1864, he served as the engineer for the Port of New York and in 1865, he became President of the United States Petroleum Company. He also was President of the Spuyten Duyvil Rolling Mill.

He was interested in what would become the Panama Canal in Central America, and he attended the 1879 International Congress on the Canal in Paris, France. Evans collected books, and paintings which were displayed at his home, Sans Souci, in New Rochelle, New York. He donated his collection to the Smithsonian Institution before his death. He died on November 28, 1886.

References

External links
Evan's Family Papers at the RPI archives website

1817 births
1886 deaths
Morris family (Morrisania and New Jersey)
American civil engineers
People from New Rochelle, New York
People from New Brunswick, New Jersey
Rensselaer Polytechnic Institute alumni
Engineers from New York (state)
Engineers from New Jersey